The Main Staff of the Serbian Army of Krajina was the highest professional and staff organ for preparation and use of the Serbian Army of Krajina in war and in peace. 

The Main Staff was formed on 16 October 1992, and its activities started on 27 November of the same year. During its existence, the Main Staff had constant problems with personnel.

Organization 

The Main Staff consisted of the following sectors:

 Operational activities
 Informational
 Religious and justice affairs
 Logistical support
 Security
 Intelligence
 Air Force and Air Defence
 Recruitment and mobilization
 Army Inspectorate

The Main Staff had direct control over:

 105th Aviation Brigade
 44th Artillery-Rocket Brigade of the Air Defence
 75th Mixed Artillery Brigade
 75th Rear Base
 Training Center "1300 Corporals"
 Military Police Battalion
 Communications Battalion
 House of the Army
 Army Library
 Army Band
 Training Center "Alpha"

On the other hand, a joint command existed in the Main Staff, which coordinated activities of all departments. It was headed by Major general Borislav Đukić (1993–1994) and Major general Dušan Lončar (1994–1995).

List of commanders

See also 
 Serbian Army of Krajina

References

Bibliography 
 
 
 

Military of Serbian Krajina
Republic of Serbian Krajina
1992 establishments in Croatia
1995 disestablishments in Croatia